Rowland Dawkins (died 1691) was a Welsh military colonel and politician who sat in the House of Commons at various times between 1654 and 1656. He was a zealous supporter of the Commonwealth.

Dawkins was the son of George Dawkins of Clivrough and his wife Elizabeth Glyn, daughter of William Glyn of Glynonvawr, Carmarthenshire. He became a colonel in the Commonwealth army and was governor of Carmarthen and Tenby in 1650. In 1651 he suppressed a rising at Llanbadarn. He was appointed to the High Court of Justice  on 25 June 1651 and became a Military Commissioner for South Wales on 14 March 1654.

In 1654, Dawkins was elected Member of Parliament for Carmarthenshire in the First Protectorate Parliament. In 1654 and subsequent years he petitioned for the abatement of the assessment for Cardiganshire. He became an alderman of Swansea in 1655. On 27 November 1655 he was ordered with Jenkin Lloyd, Arthur Owen, Sampson Lort, James Philipps and others to examine the petition of the well-affected of Haverfordwest regarding the election of a malignant to office. He was re-elected MP for Carmarthenshire in 1656 for the Second Protectorate Parliament. He commanded the Militia Troops in Pembrokeshire, Carmarthenshire and Cardiganshire until 13 July 1659.  In 1659 he was elected MP for Carmarthen and Cardigan  for the Third Protectorate Parliament but was unseated for Carmarthen and sat for Cardigan. He was in command of troops at Tenby in 1679.
 
Dawkins died in 1691 and was buried in the chancel of Penmark church.

Dawkins married Mary Bowen, daughter of George Bowen of Lovegrove, Cardiganshire.

References

 
 

Year of birth missing
1691 deaths
Members of the Parliament of England (pre-1707) for constituencies in Wales
17th-century Welsh politicians
17th-century soldiers
Welsh army officers
Roundheads
English MPs 1654–1655
English MPs 1656–1658
English MPs 1659
17th-century Welsh military personnel